The 1994 Open Gaz de France was a women's tennis tournament played on indoor carpet courts at the Stade Pierre de Coubertin in Paris in France that was part of Tier II of the 1994 WTA Tour. It was the 2nd edition of the tournament and was held from 15 February until 20 February 1994. First-seeded Martina Navratilova won the singles title and earned $80,000 first-prize money.

Finasl

Singles

 Martina Navratilova defeated  Julie Halard 7–5, 6–3
 It was Navratilova's 1st title of the year and the 336th of her career.

Doubles

 Sabine Appelmans /  Laurence Courtois defeated  Mary Pierce /  Andrea Temesvári 6–4, 6–4
 It was Appelmans' 2nd title of the year and the 5th of her career. It was Courtois' only title of the year and the 1st of her career.

External links
 ITF tournament edition profile
 Tournament draws

Open Gaz de France
Open GDF Suez
Open Gaz de France
Open Gaz de France
Open Gaz de France